The 1958–59 Ashes series consisted of five cricket Test matches, each scheduled for six days with eight ball overs. It formed part of the MCC tour of Australia in 1958–59, and the matches outside the Tests were played in the name of the Marylebone Cricket Club. The England team led by Peter May was labelled the strongest ever to leave England. It had the formidable bowling attack of Fred Trueman, Frank Tyson, Brian Statham, Peter Loader, Jim Laker and Tony Lock; the all-rounder Trevor Bailey; the outstanding wicket-keeper Godfrey Evans; and the batting of Colin Cowdrey, Tom Graveney, Raman Subba Row and Ted Dexter. They had won the last three Ashes series in 1953, 1954–55 and 1956, but lost the series 4–0 to Australia. It was one of the biggest upsets in Test cricket history and the biggest margin of defeat in an Ashes series since the 5–0 "whitewashing" inflicted by Warwick Armstrong's Australians in 1920–21.

The triumph of the Australian team was mainly due to its aggressive captain Richie Benaud, now regarded as one of the greatest captains in Test cricket, who led what appeared to be an average team to five series victories in succession. The Australian fielding was outstanding, turning many a half-chance into a catch. Their opener Colin McDonald made 519 runs (64.67), the first batsman to exceed 500 runs in an Ashes series since Len Hutton in 1950–51. Benaud and Alan Davidson had previously underperformed against England, but now realised their full potential. Benaud took 31 wickets (18.83), the most by an Australian in an Ashes series since Monty Noble in 1901–02, and Davidson 24 wickets (19.00).

In English eyes at least the defeat was partly the result of questionable umpiring and the even more questionable bowling actions of Ian Meckiff, Keith Slater, Jim Burke and Gordon Rorke. The team was also handicapped by a long list of injuries, with 12 of their players being unfit to play at some point on the tour.

First Test – Brisbane

The First Test was, I honestly think, the dullest and most depressing I have ever watched...Even at this range of time one finds the gorge rising at the recollection of a piece of cricket for which there was no tactical or technical justification whatever. Did England think the pitch was going to go? Did they hope to bat out a draw? The answer is that the pitch at the end was perfect, and Australia's eight wicket win was gained with a day and a bit to spare.
E. W. Swanton

Preliminaries
Compared to the Fifth Test against New Zealand at the Kennington Oval in 1958 England made only two changes to their team. Willie Watson had only just recovered from his knee operation and was replaced as the number three batsman by the in form Tom Graveney. Fred Trueman was laid low by lumbago, which also affected him when he arrived in Queensland in 1962–63, and was replaced by Peter Loader even though he had just recovered from a strained Achilles tendon and high temperature. Loader, Laker, Lock and Statham had taken plenty of wickets on tour and Graveney and captain Peter May had made the most runs. Australia also had two changes from their last team, the Fifth Test against South Africa at Port Elizabeth in 1957–58. Captain Ian Craig had resigned due to ill-health and was replaced by the debutant strokemaker Norm O'Neill and Peter Burge replaced Bobby Simpson, who was twelfth man. Australia did not recall the veteran Ray Lindwall even though he had taken 7/73 for Queensland against the MCC and had swung the ball prodigiously. After vice-captain Neil Harvey captained an Australian XI to a 345 run defeat against the MCC the selectors made the surprise choice of Richie Benaud as Australian captain. He had just succeeded Craig as the captain of New South Wales, but had yet to lead his state. There was a thunderstorm before the match which precluded net practise and the air was heavy, which made the loss of Trueman's swing bowling all the more meaningful.

England first innings
Four years before Len Hutton had won the toss, put Australia in to bat and watched them made 601/8 declared. The week before Neil Harvey had said that "the pitch at Brisbane was the best in Australia for batting", but Keith Miller wrote "the best thing Benaud could do for Australia was lose the toss", No captain had put the opposition in to bat in an Ashes series and won since Johnny Douglas in the Fourth Test at Melbourne Cricket Ground in the 1911–12 Ashes series. Bearing this in mind it was a bad toss to win and May made the difficult decision to bat on a green wicket which looked favourable to the fast bowlers in the expectation that it would flatten out in the afternoon. Arthur Milton was surprised by a straight ball by Ian Meckiff (3/33), who had been spraying his deliveries up to two feet on either side of the stumps. Keith Miller recalled "Meckiff was all over the place...the cynical reckoned he fired too wide to be hit...it was, in fact, the most erratic piece of fast bowling I had ever seen in a Test match. Yet it helped to put Australia on top". Peter Richardson depended on neat deflections for many of his runs, but had not managed to adapt to the faster Australian wickets and Benaud fed in an extra slip and another when the England opener slipped the ball between the fielders until he was caught by Ken Mackay off Alan Davidson (3/36) and England were 16/2. Tom Graveney (19) was beaten several times by Davidson and was dropped by Norm O'Neill, who then damaged a finger fielding and was sent to hospital for x-rays. He added 46 with May (28) before wicket-keeper Wally Grout snapped them both up. Cowdrey (13) fell a great catch by Lindsay Kline and Godfrey Evans to another by Peter Burge. Benaud had made his new ball bowlers stay on for over an hour in their opening spell, and called them back for more until they were exhausted. He had been bowling to give them a rest, but now started on the long England tail. "The Boil" Trevor Bailey (Bailey was pronounced "Boiley" by the Australians) took two hours to make 27 in his own dull way, but hit a couple of boundaries after seeing Jim Laker do so. Davidson had to leave the field exhausted and Benaud (3/46) had Bailey stumped to end the innings for 134.

Australia first innings

There was only time for two overs before stumps and Brian Statham made the ball lift outside the off-stump, which might have produced a wicket given another quarter of an hour, but Colin McDonald and Jim Burke survived the day on 8/0. The first day had produced only 142 runs and although the Saturday was bright and clear and good for batting, only 148 runs were made as an excellent England bowling attack regained the initiative and the Australian batsmen eked out the runs. Burke edged a catch to gully, but Trevor Bailey was too deep to catch it and after a slow start—and much to everybody's surprise—he peeled off a couple of cover-drives off Peter Loader. Loader was repeatedly no-balled and was replaced by Bailey and the openers took their partnership past fifty when the sightscreen was laboriously moved and Loader returned round the wicket to have Burke caught behind for 20. The teams went off for lunch at the fall of the wicket and returned on 55/1 with Neil Harvey coming in instead of Ken Mackay as announced by the scoreboard, indicating that Benaud wanted the runs to flow. Bailey had McDonald caught in slip for 42 in two hours and Norm O'Neill (who had not broken his finger as first thought) came in with the hopes of Australia hanging on his shoulders. May set a defensive field to limit his runmaking, but he hit his first ball for four before the runs dried up and he was outpaced by "Slasher" Mackay. Loader (4/56) caught Harvey l.b.w. after he had spent an hour making 14. Bailey (3/35) accounted for the out of form Peter Burge and had O'Neill was caught by a spectacular diving catch by Tom Graveney for 34 in 151 minutes, Jim Laker (2/15) had Mackay (16) caught behind, much to his displeasure and Australia ended the day on 156/6, 22 runs ahead. After the rest day Australia did not long survive the fall of Benaud (16) on the Monday morning, l.b.w. to Loader and the tail collapsed to 186 all out despite the best efforts of Alan Davidson (25), last man out to Laker.

England second innings
Even Australia's collapse gave them a lead of 52 on a wicket which had dried out and looked a lot better for batting, but the England openers failed again. Peter Richardson was brilliantly caught and bowled by Richie Benaud who had relieved Alan Davidson. Peter May sent in Trevor Bailey—"The Barnacle"—at number three, a very negative move given his reputation as England should have been looking to runs. He was soon joined by Tom Graveney when Milton was caught by Wally Grout off Davidson at 34/2. The stylish Graveney was often criticised for getting out carelessly, but he survived two l.b.w. appeals in an over from Benaud, who beat the bat twice more without success. They took the score to 92/2 by the end of the day, a lead of 40 runs, with only 122 runs coming in the day. On the fourth day Graveney was halfway down the wicket going for an easy single when Bailey sent him back and he was run out for 36 after staying in for nearly three hours. May was soon out to Benaud (4/66), but Colin Cowdrey (28) stuck in for over two hours before he was caught by Lindsay Kline at grass level. Umpire McInnes was unsighted, but after a nod from Umpire Hays at square-leg umpire gave Cowdrey out, even though he was briefly called back by Harvey, who doubted that the ball had carried. "The Boil" remained glued to the crease for 357 minutes making the slowest 50 by an Englishman in Tests. "Trevor was apt to enjoy playing a character part. 'Barnacle Bailey' as a sobriquet had stuck all too firmly...to the infinite frustration of the crowds—which here at Brisbane showed their feeling by simply staying away" wrote E.W. Swanton, who questioned "whether victory, if it should come, is worth the cost in terms of sterile, boring play that makes one sick at heart to watch". To be fair to Bailey he had been hailed as a saviour playing in this fashion in 1953 and 1954–55 and was unlikely to change his style at the end of his career. Benaud did not help as he set the field to cut off the stonewaller's limited repertoire of strokes, with Meckiff bowling down the leg side. One pressman roused himself to ask when Bailey had last scored a run, "Twenty minutes past two" answered the England scorer George Duckworth, "Today or yesterday?" was the reply. Just before stumps Bailey suddenly rushed down the pitch to take a swipe at Mackay, missed and was bowled for 68. It was a strangely reckless end as a few more minutes would have allowed Peter May the use of the heavy roller in the morning to break up the wicket for his bowlers. Bailey had batted for 458 minutes and scored from only 40 of the 427 balls he faced. Only 106 runs were made in a full day's play, the lowest in an Ashes Test.

Australia second innings
Coming back on the fifth and penultimate day Australia needed 146 runs to win and did so in style thanks to Norm O'Neill. The spinners Jim Laker and Tony Lock were brought on early as May's only hope was that the pitch would take spin, but few balls turned and he maintained his defensive field placings. Laker had McDonald out for 15, and Lock dismissed Harvey for 23. Jim Burke looked uncomfortable and dug himself in while O'Neill started to hit the ball and ran for singles when other batsmen in the match were content to stand still. He rattled up 71 not out in under two hours and hooked Loader for his seventh boundary for the winning runs, Burke having spent over four hours making 28 not out, even slower than Bailey.

Result
Australia won the First Test by 8 wickets to go 1–0 up in the series, the fourth win in four Tests for Australia against England at the Woolloongabba. England's scoring rate of 23 runs in every 100 balls (the equivalent of 1.38 runs per six-ball over) was one of the worst in Test cricket, Australia made 34 runs off every 100 balls (the equivalent of 2.04 runs per six-ball over). The England manager Freddie Brown wanted to make an official complaint about Meckiff's bowling, but captain Peter May thought that it look like sour grapes. Instead they talked unofficially to the Australian chairman of selectors Sir Donald Bradman who retorted "And what of the action of the England bowlers Tony Lock and Peter Loader?" and that they should "first of all put their own house in order". It was an inauspicious start to the brighter cricket May had promised, which was needed to revive the fortunes of Australian cricket that was being ignored by its youth. "The Future of Australian Cricket at Stake...the average young Australian is inclined to spend most of his weekends under water...and caring for his lady-friend. There are many other things to do in the sunshine than play cricket".

Second Test – Melbourne

The events of the Melbourne Test at the New Year would have tested the philosophical detachment of any cricket writer, of whatever school. I'm glad to see in my preview before the game I noted that the increase in doubtful actions had been the most remarkable aspect of Australian cricket on the tour, and I named three suspects—Meckiff, Slater and Burke. I said that both Slater and Burke had been no-balled, once in each case, for throwing, and that I hoped the Australian umpires would do their unpleasant duty if the 'be not entirely satisfied', as the Law ordains. Vain Hope!
E. W. Swanton

Preliminaries
The loss of the First Test was not the end of the series and Peter May well remembered the crushing Brisbane defeat in the First Test of the 1954–55 Ashes series, which Len Hutton had won 3–1. Arthur Milton had returned to form with innings of 85 against Tasmania, but had broken his finger in a gutsy 37 against South Australia. With the spare opener Raman Subba Row nursing a broken wrist Willie Watson—who had been part of the 1950 FIFA World Cup England squad in Brazil—was brought in, but Trevor Bailey was promoted to the opening spot regardless of his paralysing influence at Brisbane. Fred Trueman had recovered from his back trouble to take 5/46 and 4/33 against South Australia and said he was fully fit, but was not chosen. Instead May preferred to keep the pace attack that had bowled so accurately in the first innings at Brisbane. The Australians dropped Peter Burge from their twelve-man squad and brought in the 22-year-old Keith Slater who had taken 4/33 for Western Australia in the first match of the tour and could bowl both fast-medium and off-spin. In the end he was twelfth man instead of the talented batsman Bobby Simpson, who made his Ashes debut.

England first innings
The wicket was greener than usual for the Melbourne Cricket Ground and the air was heavy again, the dark clouds dimming the ground, but the pitch was not expected to last and when Peter May won the toss on his 29th birthday (New Year's Eve) he had to bat first even though his opening batsmen were known to be brittle. They survived into the third over when "Davo" Davidson (6/64) wrecked the innings with three wickets; Peter Richardson caught by Wally Grout for 3, Willie Watson undone by a yorker on his fourth ball and Tom Graveney for a golden duck by a brute of a ball that swung viciously and caught him leg before wicket. Peter May came in at 7/3 to survive the hat-trick and rebuild the innings, bringing up his first runs with a magnificent drive off Meckiff. Davidson bowled neatly and made the ball move, but "Meckiff used the whole bowling crease, delivering balls from near the stumps and as wide as possible to the return crease" and could find no swing. Fortunately for England Trevor Bailey was full of confidence and hit 6 fours in two and a half hours on his way to 48. Ken Mackay replaced Meckiff and almost had May caught in the slips, and Richie Benaud who replaced him missed a caught and bowled with his first delivery, but Davidson was kept on until lunch, when he was exhausted. They returned after lunch and the crowd saw the unprecedented sight of "The Boil" hitting Benaud for successive boundaries, but he was caught by the Australian captain off a slower ball from Meckiff, who had finally replaced Davidson and England were 92/4. Colin Cowdrey came in low at number 6 and stuck in for another do or die partnership with May, both playing disciplined innings with classical strokes. With Neil Harvey and Norm O'Neill dominating the covers runs were hard to come by and they ended the day on 173/4. Benaud delayed asking for the new ball as his fast bowlers were tired and May and Cowdrey attacked the slow bowling, particularly that of Lindsay Kline. The captain reached his century by pulling Kline to the mid-wicket boundary and hitting the next ball with such power that Mackay, 50 yards away, did not have time to move before it flew past him for another four. It was the first Test hundred by an English captain in Australia since Archie MacLaren made 116 in the First Test at Sydney in 1901–02. The new ball was now taken with England 206/4 and Davidson and Meckiff returned to the attack, Meckiff (3/69) bowling May for 113 with an extra fast delivery that swung in and crashed into his stumps. Meckiff reckoned this to be the best ball he ever bowled "the sun was shining, and May was batting beautifully at the time. Yet he explained it later that he had completed lost the ball from the instant it left the hand". Godfrey Evans (4) could not cope with Meckiff's pace and Cowdrey (44) was caught by Grout off Davidson and England collapsed to 218/7. Jim Laker (dropped off his first ball) stayed in for over an hour making 22 not out, but Davidson bowled Brian Statham and Peter Loader and they were all out for 259.

Australia first innings
Despite the England collapse the pitch was losing its moisture and looked better for runs. Colin McDonald and Neil Harvey saw the day out with 96/1 for the loss of Jim Burke, bowled by Statham for 3 when he left the ball alone. Lacking the pace of the Australian bowlers Statham and Loader could not make the ball lift as they had done and Trevor Bailey and Jim Laker suffered as Harvey struck 10 fours in his 60 not out by the end of New Year's Day. They returned to the fray the following morning with May setting only one slip as he tried to stop the flow of runs, which saved Harvey when he edged to the vacant second slip on 67. Bailey bowled down the leg side with a leg field while Harvey watched the balls go by, but he and McDonald were able to run quickly between the wickets and keep the score ticking over, but only 39 runs were made off 18 eight–ball overs before lunch. Soon after the break Tom Graveney took a juggled catch at first slip off Statham to dismiss McDonald for 47 after four hours. Norm O'Neill came into a defensive field to Tony Lock bowling round the wicket and found it difficult to make runs, but tried one cracking drive that was stopped by the bowler and hurt his hand. Harvey tok 267 minutes to make his century, but there was a huge roar round the giant Melbourne Ground when he reached three figures. With his hundred up he attacked Laker and Lock, but with tight fields and accurate bowling he was unable to get away. The new ball was taken after tea and Statham had O'Neill (37) caught behind trying a powerful stroke off his back foot. Peter Loader, who had been plundered for 36 runs in 8 overs bowled Harvey (167) when he missed an on–drive. Considering the quality and the accuracy of the bowling Alec Bedser thought this was Harvey's best century and it was greatly appreciated by the 71,000 crowd. They could not have enjoyed what followed as Bobby Simpson and Richie Benaud went for ducks and Australia crashed from 255/2 to 262/6. Ken Mackay (18) and Alan Davidson (25) pulled the score to 282/6 by the end of the day, but Statham (7/57) had them out in the morning, then cleaned up tail for 308. He became only the sixth England bowler to take seven wickets in a Test innings in Australia after Tom Richardson (8/94), George Lohmann (8/35 and 8/58), Wilfred Rhodes (7/56 and 8/68), Doug Wright (7/105) and Frank Tyson (7/27). Once again Neil Harvey had scored over half the innings for Australia, but they were only 49 runs ahead.

England second innings
I never saw anything so blatant as Meckiff's action as, with the swell of the crowd in his ears, he came up that afternoon full pelt from the bottom end towards the pavillion...the English press camp were outspoken to a degree and at least one Australian, Jack Fingleton, writing in the Sunday Times, thought Meckiff should have been called... England had a grievance, without a doubt.
E.W. Swanton
The 49 run deficit was thought to be counterbalanced by the runs England could expect to get on a plumb wicket, but such hope were quickly dispelled. Richardson was out yet again trying to play the ball through the slips and being caught by Neil Harvey off Ian Meckiff. Willie Watson showed his lack of practice and was beaten by the pace of Alan Davidson. The 60,000 crowd were now strongly behind the Australian team and Tom Graveney's entry in the MCG was compared to the arrival of a Christian being fed to the lions in the Colosseum. He received a sharply rising ball from Ian Meckiff which was caught at full stretch by "The Claw" at short-fine-leg. Peter May joined Trevor Bailey, who was back to his usual stone-walling self and had stayed in for an almost an hour for 14 when he was finely caught by Jim Burke, also at short-fine leg, off a brute of a ball from Meckiff that rose high and hit his glove and bat-handle. Meckiff was bowling with far more accuracy than normal, but retained his fast pace and both he and Davidson bowled left-arm over the wicket, an unusual type of delivery that unsettled the England team. Benaud had also set a short-fine-leg with a short-leg behind him to catch the rising ball as the batsmen fended it off their body. Colin Cowdrey stayed in for 19 minutes before he played at a ball slanting wide across him and was caught by Wally Grout. Godfrey Evans went for a run which wasn't there and cracked his finger as his flung himself at the crease trying to make his ground. May, who had played a typically self-denying innings of 17 in 98 minutes when he was caught by Davidson off Meckiff, again the ball was angled awkwardly across his body. Now there was only the tail to dismiss and they fell quickly; Tony Lock caught and bowled by Davidson, Jim Laker caught by in the slips by Harvey off Davidson and Peter Loader bowled by Meckiff for a duck to leave England 87 all out. Ian Meckiff (6/38) took the best Test figures of his career, backed up by superlative catching from the Australian fielders and Davidson's 3/41.

Australia second innings
Australia needed 42 to win and were 9/1 at stumps, with Colin McDonald lbw to Brian Statham (1/11). After the rest day nightwatchman Wally Grout was stumped by Evans off Jim Laker (1/7) despite the wicketkeeper's broken finger, but this was inadequate consolation for the easy Australian win as they made the 42/2 required.

Result
Australia won the Second Test by 8 wickets to take a 2–0 lead in the series. The English press thought England had been "thrown out", but there was no disguising that it was a dismal batting display from England on a good wicket. It was their worst score in Australia since Archie MacLaren's team were dismissed for 61 in 1901–02, ironically at Melbourne in the innings following the last time an England captain had made a century in Australia. Having not made an official complaint after the game against Victoria or the First Test at Brisbane the MCC were in no position to make an official complaint now Meckiff had won a Test. No umpire in Australia, South Africa or New Zealand had called him for throwing. He had even survived complaints by New South Wales when he was chosen for the 1957–58 tour ahead of one of their bowlers, he had been filmed and given the approval of the Australian Board of Control and had the support of his captain Richie Benaud. With no other game coming between the two Tests the teams proceeded to Sydney for the Third Test.

Third Test – Sydney

A great effort would have been needed by the England batsmen to put them in a position beyond defeat, and Milton and Bailey went to the wicket with a load on their shoulders. Benaud at once set a very aggressive field, especially to Bailey, where he fielded only three yards from the bat to Meckiff's bowling, a little deeper for Davidson. Bailey had a word with Benaud, no doubt asking him not to move when the bowler was running up to bowl. I thought he was so close that if Bailey had put his bat out to swing at a ball he would have hit him.
Alec Bedser

Preliminaries
England obviously needed to do something to maintain their hold on the Ashes and three changes were made to the team. The first was forced as Godfrey Evans had broken his middle finger and the reserve wicket-keeper Roy Swetman made his Test debut. This was not so much of a loss as first thought, Evans had not batted well for some years and Swetman had impressed behind the stumps throughout the tour and his batting had improved beyond all hopes. Peter Richardson had failed repeatedly as an opening batsman in the Tests and was replaced by his old opening partner Arthur Milton, even though he had broken his finger at Christmas. Willie Watson was dropped in favour of the newly arrived Cambridge and Sussex batsman Ted Dexter, who was also a more than useful swing bowler. May also had his final trump card, the fast bowler Fred Trueman, who had been ill at Brisbane and left out at Melbourne. He is widely considered to be England's greatest fast bowler and with good reason; he was the first man to take 300 wickets in Tests—307 at (21.57)—had tremendous stamina and bowled with a near perfect side on action that produced late swing at high pace. He was full of confidence and believed that he could get any batsman out on any wicket. Australia made changes as well, dropping Lindsay Kline who had taken 0/77 in two Tests and Bobby Simpson who had made a duck but was retained as twelfth man for his fielding. Instead they brought in the dual purpose fast-medium seamer and off-spinner Keith Slater, who had been twelfth man in the Second Test, but who had been accused of throwing by the MCC and Keith Miller. Mel McInnes kept his place as umpire even though Peter May and Freddie Brown had pointedly asked if it was necessary for him to officiate in all the Tests.

England first innings

Peter May won the toss for the third time in a row and again decided to bat regardless of the ill-omens as the wicket looked easy going and was expected to take spin. Stonewaller Trevor Bailey who had been promoted in the batting order from 6 to 3, then 2 and was now asked to go in first with Arthur Milton. They were both out for 8 to Ian Meckiff and Alan Davidson and England were 23/2. Once again the England opening partnership had failed and Bailey, a considerable stumbling block for the bowlers down the order had been sacrificed at the top of the order. Tom Graveney (33) and Peter May (42) restored the innings as the fast bowlers found little swing, but Benaud kept them on for over an hour and May edged a ball past Neil Harvey at slip. With the shine taken off the new ball the pacemen were taken off and the spinners brought on, Richie Benaud getting turn almost at once and appealed for leg before wicket against May, but it was turned down. Keith Slater's first Test wicket was May after he had been hit for 4 and 2 and the captain looked in fine form, Slater getting the ball to hang back and it was hit where Benaud had placed Ken Mackay in the covers a few balls before, where he took a fine catch. Graveney edged Benaud just past Harvey which he managed to take for another stunning catch and Dexter was l.b.w. offering no stroke to Slater (2/40) and England were 98/5. The debutant Roy Swetman joined Colin Cowdrey to a great ovation from the 50,000 in the stands and survived a difficult catch to Harvey and another to Colin McDonald who had replaced "The Claw" at leg-slip, both chances off Benaud. The young wicket-keeper used his feet to go down the wicket, so when he padded up he could not given l.b.w., and began to make some runs with Cowdrey stroking the ball through the covers. After tea the vice-captain (34) gave Harvey another catch off Benaud, but Swetman and Tony Lock saw England safely to stumps with 190/6. The next day's start was delayed to past tea because of rain, made worse by the inadequate covering of the infield. When they finally resumed Benaud was spinning the ball more than ever and declined to take the new ball. Lock was out l.b.w. to Mackay, who ended Swetman's fine innings of 41 with another great catch off Benaud. Harvey also accounted for Jim Laker when he knocked the ball up into the air on the first attempt and ran five yards to catch it. Seeing the end was near Fred Trueman scattered the close fielders with a few powerful strokes and heaved the ball into the stands, but he was caught by Burke off Benaud to give the Australian captain 5/83 and England were out for 219. The first day was watched by John Mills and Trevor Howard, who were acting in Australia at the time. Howard compared the England collapse to the final act of the play he was in, saying "Hamlet was never like this".

Australia first innings
There was time for three overs before the end of the day, but Roy Swetman dropped Colin McDonald in the first over and Fred Trueman was not best pleased, "getting a wicket in my first over is always a great motivator, and seeing a decent chance put down annoyed me". He bowled again on the Monday morning after a long dry Sunday and Jim Burke edged another chance off Trueman which a diving Swetman just reached, but he was unable to hold onto it. The Yorkshire fast bowler also got edges off Burke in the untenanted lep-slip area and McDonald just wide of the wicket-keeper. With the wicket made for spin and the pacemen getting nowhere May brought on Jim Laker (5/107) and Tony Lock (4/130). McDonald and Burke started walking down the pitch, sometimes even before Laker delivered the ball, but Burke edged a catch to Lock at short fine-leg to end their opening partnership on 26. Laker and Lock varied their bowling with flight and changes of pace and Lock moved from bowling round to over the wicket as when he saw that he could make the ball turn. Neil Harvey was worried by Laker using the rough and was with him stranded on a front foot stroke when a ball pitched middle-and-leg took out his off stump. McDonald was still moving down the wicket when he missed only for Swetamn to fumble the stumping. Norm O'Neill decided to drive firmly and one powerful stroke went past Tom Graveney just 10 yards away who got hand to the ball, but failed to take a difficult catch. None of these chances were easy, but Australia had been able to make then stick in the England innings and it would cost the tourists as O'Neill settled down to make 77. May switched the bowlers' ends using Statham, who O'Neill edged twice through vacant second slip to the boundary, but the change produced a wicket when Graveney dived forward to take McDonald off Lock. This brought the opener Les Favell to the crease at 87/3 and after surviving several loud l.b.w. appeals began to cut the spinners to the boundary and reached 50 before stumps in an unbeaten stand of 99. Laker's arthritic bowling finger hurt so much that he couldn't sleep, but after they brought up their century stand Australia was Lakered and Locked on the Tuesday morning, Cowdrey taking a catch off Lock for Favell and Swetman off Laker for O'Neill, Benaud was bowled by Laker trying to hit him out of the ground and they were 208/6. This brought "Slasher" Mackay and Alan Davidson together and England needed their wickets quickly to even the first innings score. Davdison repeatedly edged the ball just off his stumps and was lucky to survive, but May kept the spinners working for an hour after the new ball was due, but with no wickets forthcoming Trueman and Statham came back into the attack. There was little life in the pitch, Swetman taking the ball about his knees, and no or little swing. The heat in Sydney reached 100 °F/38 °C and Fred Trueman was sweltering in the outfield when a man on the Hill shouted "Fred, you look in need of a beer, mate" and gave him a can of Fosters to the delight of the crowd. When he returned after his next over he found twenty beer cans waiting in a line in front of the boundary fence. Davidson was playing a restrained innings instead of hitting the ball around the ground and Mackay foreswore his stonewalling to hit boundaries, so they ended up keeping pace with each other. May brought back his spinners and as the score passed 300/6 used Bailey for the first time, though like the others he found little swing. The seventh wicket finally came when Trueman (1/46) was back for a short spell when there were clouds about and bowled Mackay (57) with a swinging yorker on 323/7—a stand of 115. Davidson was in trouble for ten minutes, but finally went leg before to Lock for 71. With the last recognised batsman dismissed on 353/8 the innings was wrapped up for 357, a lead of 139.

England second innings
There was time for one over before the end of play and Bailey and Milton survived on 1/0. Richie Benaud set a very aggressive field, himself just three yards from Bailey, close enough to be hit by the bat, and was asked not to move as the Meckiff came in to bowl in case he distracted the batsman. Meckiff did not bowl for long as he bruised his Achilles tendon and retired from the field. Milton and Bailey held out for an hour and saw off the fast bowlers, before Milton edged a Benaud googly to Davidson and Bailey, after sweeping Slater to the boundary tried to sweep Benaud and was caught by Bobby Simpson, who had come on for Meckiff, and England were 37/2. Graveney was playing consistently into the twenties and thirties and was out for 22 when he missed a full toss from Davidson and was l.b.w. May had been playing and missing several times in a row going for shots and looked vulnerable, but at 64/3 he was joined by Cowdrey for another heroic partnership. Benaud was still crowding the batsmen with close fielders and Cowdrey began to stroke powerfully to drive them away. May called for a new bat and Peter Richardson brought out three; a barracker shouting "Peter, you haven't got one there wide enough!" The new bat appeared to solve his problems as May found his touch and they added 92 runs between lunch and tea. After tea they passed the deficit and Benaud became very defensive for the only prolonged period in the series, bowling ten overs of negative leg theory. Len Hutton thought Benaud was worried about being Lakered and Locked on the sixth and final day, but Bill O'Reilly called it "tossing in the towel". Benaud rested Davidson the next morning after he opened the bowling and gave him the new ball with Keith Slater bowling at fast-medium pace, but it barely swung or moved off the pitch and by lunch both batsmen were on 82 and the score 231/3. Slater looked outclassed in Test cricket and after lunch he was replaced by the part-time bowling of Jim Burke, and to everyone's surprise he bowled May for 92 with a faster ball after a partnership of 182. Ted Dexter came in, but Benaud returned to a more attacking mode and had him caught behind as he tried to play his strokes. Cowdrey now played out time as the next two batsmen fell cheaply, Swetman L.b.w. to Burke and Trueman stumped first ball off Benaud. After eighty minutes in the 90s Cowdrey reached his century, May declared on 287/7 and the game was saved.

Australia second innings
Australia needed 151 runs in 100 minutes, but Benaud did not attempt it. Laker (2/10) was soon brought on and yorked Burke. May asked McDonald, who had pulled a hamstring when playing the MCC for the Australian XI, if he wanted to retire, but as he was walking off the pitch Benaud sent out a runner and insisted that he bat, but was bowled first ball. Harvey and O'Neill batted out time and Australia finished the game on 54/2

Result
England and Australia drew the match. England were happy that they had saved the Test, but their batting was still weak with only Graveney, May and Cowdrey capable of playing Benaud's leg-spin with any confidence. Trueman had bowled well without any luck and Laker and Lock had shown their spinning skills, but the English fielding needed to be improved. Benaud was criticised for his defensive tactics, but said he had a job to do and 2–0 up was good for him and his team.

Fourth Test – Adelaide

Rorke, who is six feet four inches, has a very short run which produces tremendous pace, and is another bowler whose action is subject to criticism. His delivery, to say the most, was unusual, and it was amazing to me that a bowler could generate so much pace from such a short run...he lands some four feet beyond the batting crease at the moment of delivery, with a tremendous drag, and it means he delivers the ball from some nineteen yards.
Alec Bedser

Preliminaries
The Australians dropped Keith Slater and replaced him with the veteran fast bowler Ray Lindwall after an absence of 18 months. Although now 37 he had been training hard and had bowled well, having taken 7/73 against MCC. With 212 Test wickets Lindwall was the second greatest Australian wicket taker after Clarrie Grimmett (216) and he was determined to beat the record. Ian Meckiff had bruised his Achilles tendon at Sydney and was unfit to play, but any joy the England camp may have felt was reduced when they debuted the  "Blonde Giant" Gordon Rorke after he had taken 6/58 against Queensland and 4/57 in the recent tour match. Incidentally, Rorke was the only Australian tailender as the other ten players were First Class cricket centurions. For England, Peter Richardson returned to open the batting with Trevor Bailey because Arthur Milton had re-fractured his broken finger and Raman Subba Row still had a damaged wrist. The alternative opener was Willie Watson—who replaced Ted Dexter—but he had made 141 batting at number 6 against Victoria and May wanted to keep him in the lower-middle order. Peter Loader had a groin strain that had kept him out of the New South Wales game, but the great shock was that the off-spinner Jim Laker, England's best bowler, could not play because his arthritic spinning finger was immobile. As a result, Frank Tyson was recalled after two years out of the team, having had taken 3/40 and 4/55 in the last two matches. Godfrey Evans replaced Roy Swetman as wicket-keeper even though his broken middle finger had not fully mended as the young Surrey keeper had proved fallible behind the stumps. As a result, May had four fast bowlers and only one spinner on a pitch that was traditionally a good batting surface with low bounce, though the South Australia game at Christmas had seen a green, pacey wicket. This was the only Test in which the three great England fast bowlers of the 1950s Tyson, Trueman and Statham all played together. Mel McInnes was umpire again, much to the annoyance of the England team as he had made mistakes in all his matches leading up to the Fourth Test. The 1956 Australians successfully asked for the great English umpire Frank Chester to be removed when an illness made his decisions erratic.

Australia first innings
May won the toss for the fourth time in a row and felt obliged to bowl first so that his pacemen would get the benefit of any life there was in the pitch, but the wicket was brown and dry and full of runs. It was a gamble that relied on a quick breakthrough, though May may have been nervous about the effect of Ray Lindwall, Alan Davidson and Gordon Rorke on his fragile batting line up. Brian Statham got the first ball to nip back and almost hit McDonald's stump, and another went between Jim Burke's bat and pad only to miss off stump. Tyson bowled a good spell for no luck as did Trueman when he was brought back on and the batsmen played and missed throughout the day. Just before lunch Burke deflected a ball off his glove to first slip, where Evans dived out to catch it, but Umpire McInnes gave Burke (then on 24) not out. Burke fell later for 66, the only Australian wicket to fall on the first day, when he mis-cut a ball from Trevor Bailey to Colin Cowdrey in the gully. He had batted for over four hours in an opening partnership of 171 during which he made two boundaries. Neil Harvey came in and at the end of the day hit Tony Lock for a long straight six towards Adelaide Cathedral, the longest boundary in the world, and "directed our eyes to the towers and pinnacles". Harvey and McDonald saw stumps at 200/1 and carried their partnership to 268/1 when McDonald retired hurt after pulling a leg muscle. Harvey (41) was run out when he called for a second run and Brian Statham hitting the stumps. Statham (3/83) caused a small collapse to 294/4 (effectively 294/5) as he bowled Les Favell and had Ken Mackay caught by wicket-keeper Godfrey Evans. McInnes took such a long time to give Ken Mackay out when he snicked the ball to Evans that in the end Mackay walked back to the pavilion, almost unheard of in Australia at the time and the crowd applauded his sportsmanship. Norm O'Neill (56) was playing well and one terrific pull smacked into the boundary fence before any fielder could move and added 75 with Richie Benaud who hit 7 fours in his 46, including a powerful hook off Trueman (4/90). The Yorkshireman never gave up and dismissed Benaud, Lindwall and Grout as the innings continued into the third day. McDonald returned at 407/7 with Burke as his runner and should have been run out when Trueman flattened the stumps when Burke ran round the back of McInnes and was out by yards. McInnes indicated that he was out then said not out as he could not see whether Burke had reached the crease in time. McDonald and Burke were walking to the pavilion when they were called back and McDonald was so annoyed that he told Fred to bowl straight and pulled away his bat to expose his stumps and gave the fast bowler "the easiest Test wicket I have ever taken". The Victorian opener had batted for seven hours and seven minutes for 170, his highest Test century and the highest score of the series. Alan Davidson hit 43 before he became the Tyson's only wicket, caught by Bailey two feet off the ground at short-leg, a poor reward for his untiring efforts with the ball and the outfield. Evans' unhealed finger broke again, but he continued to keep wicket on the second day and raised everybody's spirits with his chirpy optimism. He was replaced after the rest day by Tom Graveney, a part-time keeper for Gloucestershire who had played the part before at Old Trafford against South Africa in 1955. Australia's 476 was the highest innings of the series and virtually won the Ashes by protecting their 2–0 lead.

England first innings
At the end of the Australian innings the temperature dropped and a breeze came up which helped the Australian bowlers Alan Davidson and Ray Lindwall with their swing. Peter Richardson and Trevor Bailey were soon out and at 11/2 Peter May (37), promoted to number 3 to protect the other batsmen, and Colin Cowdrey (84) were back at the crease. They attacked the bowling with finely tuned strokes and with Graveney (41) took England to 170/3, May was bowled by Richie Benaud (5/91) when he tried to hit him for six. On the fourth day England collapsed to 188/9, Gordon Rorke (3/23) starting the rot by bowling Cowdrey, who edged the ball onto his stumps, and having Graveney caught by Benaud despite the ball coming off the bat at high speed. Tom Graveney recalled "I had a personal experience of Richie's tactical genius...he held up play while he moved the short leg round a couple of yards. It interrupted my flow because I was forced to wonder why he had done it and whether I should be expecting a new direction from the bowler. This was exactly the reaction that Richie had wanted. There was no reason for the move other than to apply psychological pressure. He was a master at upsetting the concentration of batsman and reach their subconscious" Benaud then dismissed Trueman, Lock, Tyson and Evans, two caught by Wally Grout, one by Burke and the other by the bowler himself. England were 89 runs short of saving the follow on, but Willie Watson and Brian Statham stayed at the crease for 70 minutes. Statham, who batted left-handed, hit 6 fours in a new highest Test score of 36 not out. Lindwall was given the new ball, but could only shave the stumps as Statham hit out. Davidson tripped in one of Trueman's foot marks and had to retire from the field. In the end Rorke bowled Watson to end the 52 run last wicket stand 37 runs short of their target. Rorke on debut returned figures of 18.1–7–23–3, his low economy due to his large number of almost wides and high pace and in one three over spell only one ball could have been played.

England second innings
As the teams returned up the pavilion steps Sir Donald Bradman called Richie Benaud to one side and reminded him that England's only chance of retaining the Ashes was it they were forced to follow on and made a lot of runs. Benaud agreed with him, but excused himself as he had to go and tell Peter May that he was going to bat again. When he reached the dressing room he consoled May with what Sir Donald had said. This was repeated by cricket commentators when a Test side in this situation must win, notably when Allan Border's Australians followed on at The Oval in 1985. Watson (40) returned with Richardson (43) and together they saw off the new ball to end the day on 43/0, and produced the highest England opening stand of the series, staying for almost three hours and adding 89. Davidson could not bowl after his injury, Rorke opened the bowling with Lindwall and Benaud had to bowl himself for a spell of four hours. The partnership ended when Watson pulled a full toss from the captain and Les Favell ran in to take the catch on the boundary. Richardson fell to Benaud (4/84) padding up against a ball that didn't move having survived a l.b.w. appeal the ball before. May (59) and Graveney looked set for big scores, and the England captain struck Benaud for three successive fours before he was leg before by a torpedo from Rorke (2/78). Bailey was caught by Grout off Lindwall (2/70) on the last ball of the day, though he and Graveney thought the ball had come off the top of his pad. At 198/5 England's cause looked lost and Graveney could only look on as the lower order collapsed before him. Lock (9) stayed in for an hour as did Tyson, who made 33 in a stand of 46, but the other three tailenders only lasted 20 minutes and Graveney ended with 53 not out, having batted for over five hours. England's total of 270 put them only 34 runs ahead.

Australia second innings
Les Favell came into open the innings and hit the winning runs on his home ground as he and Burke made the 36/0 required.

Result
Australia won the Test by 10 wickets, the series 3–0 and regained the Ashes lost in 1953.
Congratulations to Australia, they were the better team...I felt that with Laker not fit we had to gamble on the first morning. I thought this was the best way to win the match, but it did not come off. Richie Benaud has a fine team; he inspired them in the field and the team brought off some wonderful catches, and generally I thought Australia's out-cricket was some of the best I have seen. We never got the starts we would have liked and injuries on the tour generally affected the batting, but I have no excuses to offer.
Peter May

Fifth Test – Melbourne

And so Australia won the match by a very convincing margin of nine wickets and put the finishing touches to the biggest defeat England had suffered in a Test series for some time.  It was the first time in forty-seven years that the captain on winning the toss had sent in the opposition and won a Test match in the England–Australia series. Australia had England on the run from the moment Benaud maintained an aggressive approach to the game, as well he might, being so much on top during the series.
Alec Bedser

Preliminaries
In the 1950–51 Ashes series the MCC tour manager Freddie Brown arrived at Melbourne for the Fifth and final Test having lost the series 4–0, but won the match and won a great ovation from the Australian crowd who admired his fighting spirit throughout the series. He now arrived with Peter May's team hoping to do the same and the players were keen to salvage something from the tour. Arthur Milton was sent home with his broken finger, Brian Statham and Peter Loader had been injured in a car accident when their tyre blew, Godfrey Evans was still recovering from his broken finger and Willie Watson suffered a groin strain bowling in the nets. This reduced the touring team to 13 fit players, but Jim Laker was ready to play and returned to the team with Ted Dexter and Roy Swetman. Tony Lock's 5 wickets had cost 75.20 and was dropped in favour of debutant off-spinner John Mortimore. This was a surprise for the Australians, but even more so to Lock, who heard the news on the radio. The home team dropped batsman Les Favell in favour of the fast bowler Ian Meckiff whose bruised foot had healed. Mel McInnes was replaced as umpire by Les Townsend in his only Test as umpire.

England first innings
For the first time in the series Richie Benaud won the toss and took the unusual step of putting England into bat, but he had four fast bowlers in his team and wanted to use them in the humid, swinging conditions. In the second over Ray Lindwall's first ball swung away and Trevor Bailey was caught first ball by Alan Davidson in third slip to give him his 216th Test wicket and equal Clarrie Grimmett's Australian record. Just before the Test Bailey had given a talk to the inmates of HMP Pentridge and had been asked if he had ever been out first ball in a Test match. He said he had not, but retained his sense of humour as he ordered roast duck for dinner after his dismissal. Peter May fell to Meckiff and England were 13/2, but Peter Richardson made a dogged 68 by forgoing his favourite deflections through the slips which had cost his wicket so many times. He added 48 with Colin Cowdrey (22) and 48 again with Tom Graveney (19), taking the score to 109/3. Tom Graveney was dismissed by Benaud; "I remember him getting me out in the 1958–59 Melbourne Test by attacking my leg stump. He bowled me two half-volleys, the first of which I drove hard to Colin McDonald at mid-on. The second was just a fraction slower, and I was committed to the stroke before I spotted it. McDonald held the catch and the critics put it down to another casual shot from Graveney. They did not seem to notice the crafty part that Benaud had played in my dismissal". Ted Dexter was out first ball to Meckiff (2/57), Roy Swetman for 1 off Davidson and Richardson was caught and bowled by Benaud to leave England 128/7. Debutant John Mortimore showed his all round skills with an unbeaten 44, adding 63 with Fred Trueman (21) before Benaud (4/43) and Davidson (3/38) finished off the innings for 205 early on the second day.

Australia first innings
The pitch still had some life when Fred Trueman and Frank Tyson opened the bowling, and Trueman was able to swing the ball. When Colin McDonald was on 12 he found one of his bails had fallen off his stumps, but an appeal for hit wicket was disallowed, though McDonald later thought that he must have hit the stumps when starting for a run. He also gave a catch to John Mortimore at short-leg, but the fieldman slipped on the wet ground and missed it. Jim Burke showed a marked dislike to the short-pitched bowling and both bowlers exploited this until he lobbed a catch to Trueman off a Tyson bouncer. Jim Laker had a temperature and sore throat, but came on to bowl with Mortimore, but neither off-spinner could get the ball to turn like Benaud's wrist spin, which usually had an advantage in Australia. McDonald was now comfortable and was using his favourite cut stroke to make runs, but Neil Harvey was not comfortable against the faster bowling and Trueman had him caught by Roy Swetman off a beautiful out-swinger. Norm O'Neill came in to bat and on "a good day for batting and with an appreciative crowd in attendance I felt like a million", but was caught by Colin Cowdrey in the gully off Fred Trueman for a first ball duck. Four years later in the Second Test on the same ground he was dismissed in exactly the same manner for another first ball duck. This left Australia 83/3, but McDonald (133) added 71 with Ken Mackay (23) and 53 with Alan Davidson (17), who was bowled for Mortimore's first Test wicket. McDonald fell to Laker (4/92) at 209/6 and England were still in the game. "Slasher" Mackay batted for two hours to reach 22 and was given a slow hand clap by the impatient crowd of 50,000. Richie Benaud (64) and Wally Grout (74, his highest Test score) hastened the scoring rate, made 115 and for the only time in the series a hundred runs was made in a session as they hooked away at the bowlers feeding them short balls. Laker got them both out in the end and Trueman was given the new ball as Ray Lindwall came to the crease. In 1953 Lindwall had hit Trueman with a wicked bouncer that "hit me so hard in the shoulder blade that I thought someone had stuck a carving knife in it". Trueman had sworn revenge, but had had to wait for five years. He got Lindwall out with a ball that ricocheted off his bat handle onto his forehead into the hands of Colin Cowdrey at slip. The Yorkshireman caught and bowled Meckiff and Swetman caught Benaud off Laker to finish the innings on 351, 146 runs ahead.

England second innings
Benaud gave a suitably motivated Lindwall the new ball and he bowled as well as he ever had, making the ball swing more than the Englishmen and bowling Trevor Bailey for a duck to record his record 217th Test wicket, the same batsman who had given him his 100th Ashes Test wicket four years before. Peter May received a torrid over, playing and missing several times in a row before he edged the ball though the slips and then to Neil Harvey. Lindall (3/37) was given a standing ovation as he left the field on the third day with England 22/2. He chased down Trueman to complain about the bouncer who told him "I'd played bugger all in the way of cricket in that summer of '53, when I came up against you at the Oval. You bowled me a bouncer then, but I didn't squeal or moan about it". Lindwall said "Christ! You still remember that?...I made a promise to myself to buy you a beer after that Test but never got round to it. What says you keep me to that promise now?" and they went to the bar. Peter Richardson (23) held off the bowlers for over two hours and put on 66 with Colin Cowdrey who looked in fine form with seven boundaries in his 44. He was run out when he trotted in for a single, even though the umpire was unsighted by the wicket-keeper Wally Grout. Cowdrey took strike again unaware of his dismissal until he was asked to depart. Richie Benaud had strained a muscle batting and Ian Meckiff damaged his Achilles tendon again so the bulk of the bowling fell to Alan Davidson (2/95). Tom Graveney made 54 and looked as good as ever, but he only got support from Trueman who tried to hit every ball and either pulled off a perfect stroke or missed completely in an entertaining 36. The young Gordon Rorke (3/41) took the last three wickets and England were out for 214.

Australia second innings
Colin McDonald made most of the opportunity to make more runs with an unbeaten 51 out of 69/1, but Jim Burke was given a barrage of short balls until his missed a shooter from Frank Tyson (1/20) and was out l.b.w. for 13.

Result
Australia won by 9 wickets to complete a 4–0 series win. It was the first time that a captain had put the opposition in to bat and won in an Ashes Test since Johnny Douglas in the Fourth Test on the same Melbourne Cricket Ground in the 1911–12 Ashes series.

Series averages
As was the convention of the time gentleman amateurs have their initials in front of their surname and professional players have their initials after their name, if used at all. The Australians were all amateurs until the Packer Revolution, even though they played like professionals.

Press corps
The English press corps sent to cover the Ashes was larger than the MCC touring team, which excited comment at the time. Even as late as 1932–33 the newspapers had sent two men to cover the series; a ghost-writer for Jack Hobbs and a tennis correspondent. The 1958–59 corps formed a considerable body of cricket knowledge; L. N. Bailey, Alex Bannister, Alec Bedser, Bill Bowes, Charles Bray, Brian Chapman, John Clarke, Charles Fortune, Harry Gee, John Kay, Ian Peebles, R. A. Roberts, Frank Rostron, Denys Rowbotham, E. W. Swanton, Johnny Wardle (who had been selected for the tour until sacked by Yorkshire), Crawford White, and John Woodcock.

References

Sources
 
 
 Benaud, Richie (1985). The Ashes Regained. BBC Video.
 Brown, Ashley (1988). The Pictorial History of Cricket. Bison Books.
 Freddi, Cris (1996). The Guinness Book of Cricket Blunders. Guinness Publishing.
 Graveney, Tom; Giller, Norman (1988). The Ten Greatest Test Teams. Sidgewick & Jackson.
 Miller, Keith (1959). Cricket From The Grandstand. Oldbourne.
 Piesse, Ken (2003). Cricket's Colosseum: 125 Years of Test Cricket at the MCG. Melbourne: Hardie Grant Books. .
 Swanton, E. W. (1977). Swanton in Australia, with MCC 1946–1975. Fontana.
 Swanton, E. W., ed. (1986). The Barclays World of Cricket. Collins.
 Titmus, Fred (2005 ). My Life in Cricket. John Blake Publishing.
 Trueman, Fred (2004). As It Was, The Memoirs of Fred Trueman. Pan Books.

Batting and Bowling Averages

Annual reviews
 Playfair Cricket Annual 1959
 Wisden Cricketers' Almanack 1960

Further reading
 
 
 Benaud, Richie (1962). A tale of two Tests: With some thoughts on captaincy. Hodder & Stoughton.
 Browning, Mark (1996). Richie Benaud: Cricketer, Captain, Guru. Kangaroo Press.
 Coleman, Robert (1993). Seasons in the Sun: the Story of the Victorian Cricket Association. Hargreen Publishing
 Frindall, Bill (1979). The Wisden Book of Test Cricket 1877–1978. Wisden.
 Frith, David (1987). Pageant of Cricket. The Macmillan Company of Australia.
 Frith, David (2007). England Versus Australia: An Illustrated History of Every Test Match Since 1877. Viking.
 Harte, Chris (1993). A History of Australian Cricket, André Deutsch.
 Kellym Ken; Lemmon, David (1985). Cricket Reflections : Five Decades of Cricket Photographs. Heinemann.
 Moyes, Alban George (1959). Benaud & Co: The story of the Tests, 1958–1959. Angus & Robertson.
 Robinson, Ray On Top Down Under. Cassell. 1975
 
 Whimpress, Bernard (2004). Chuckers: A history of throwing in Australian cricket. Elvis Press.
 Willis, Bob; Murphy, Patrick (1986). Starting with Grace. Stanley Paul.

Ashes series
Ashes series
Ashes series
Ashes series
Australian cricket seasons from 1945–46 to 1969–70
International cricket competitions from 1945–46 to 1960
The Ashes